Jean-Jacques Gosso Gosso  (born 15 March 1983) is an Ivorian former professional footballer who played as a defensive midfielder. He played in Ivory Coast, Israel, Morocco, France and Turkey. He made 22 appearances for the Ivory Coast national team, and was part of the squads at the 2010 and 2012 African Cup of Nations.

Club career

Stella Club
Born in Abidjan, Ivory Coast Gosso started his career at Stella Club d'Adjamé. In 2004, he moved to Wydad Casablanca in Morocco until the end of his contract in 2006. After that he traveled to Israel to discuss terms with Maccabi Tel Aviv in 2006. Due to financial constraints at the club, they were unable to come up the player's financial requirements.

Ashdod
Months later Gosso's name came up again but this time word had spread that F.C. Ashdod had agreed terms with the player and that he was due to sign a contract. In the end, Gosso did indeed join F.C. Ashdod where he immediately received a starting position in his first league match against Maccabi Tel Aviv.

Monaco
On 8 July 2008, it was announced that Gosso would go on trial with Monégasque side AS Monaco FC. On 22 July 2008, it was announced that Monaco would sign Gosso after the successful trial on a three-year contract.

Orduspor
Gosso signed a three-year contract with the Turkish Süper Lig club Orduspor in July 2011. On 18 October 2012, Gosso left the club after his contract was terminated two years early by mutual consent.

After finishing the 2012–2013 season at Mersin İdmanyurdu, Gosso signed a one-year contract at Ankara's Gençlerbirliği.

International career
He was member of the Ivory Coast U-20 squad in 2003 FIFA World Youth Championship in United Arab Emirates.

He was called up to the senior squad for the first time in 2008, and was named as part of the Elephants squad for the 2010 African Cup of Nations in Angola.

He was selected for the 2012 African Cup of Nations in Equatorial Guinea and Gabon, playing mostly at right-back.

Career statistics

International
Source:

Honours
 Botola: 2006
 Coupe de France runner-up: 2010
Ivory Coast
Africa Cup of Nations runner-up:2012

References

External links
 
  Football: la fiche de Jean-Jacques Gosso
  Jean-Jacques Gosso's profile on One.co.il

1983 births
Living people
Footballers from Abidjan
Association football midfielders
Ivorian footballers
Ivorian expatriate footballers
Ivory Coast under-20 international footballers
Ivory Coast international footballers
2012 Africa Cup of Nations players
2010 Africa Cup of Nations players
2010 FIFA World Cup players
Stella Club d'Adjamé players
Wydad AC players
F.C. Ashdod players
AS Monaco FC players
Orduspor footballers
Mersin İdman Yurdu footballers
Gençlerbirliği S.K. footballers
Göztepe S.K. footballers
Ligue 1 players
Israeli Premier League players
Süper Lig players
TFF First League players
Expatriate footballers in Israel
Expatriate footballers in Morocco
Expatriate footballers in Monaco
Expatriate footballers in Turkey
Ivorian expatriate sportspeople in Turkey